This article is a list of current and former known monuments of Vladimir Lenin. Many of the monuments in former Soviet republics and satellites were removed after the fall of the Soviet Union, while some of these countries retained the thousands of Lenin monuments that were erected during the Soviet period as part of Lenin's cult of personality.

Important regions and capital cities of countries are highlighted in bold.

Africa

Americas

Antarctica

Asia

Europe

Belarus

 Babruysk
 Baranovichi
 Barysaw
 Belaazyorsk
 Brest
 Bykhaw
 Chachersk
 Davyd-Haradok
 Drahichyn
 Dzyarzhynsk
 Gomel
 Grodno
 Klimavichy
 Kobryn
 Lahoysk
 Lida
 Maladzyechna
 Malaryta
 Mazyr
 Minsk
 Mogilev
 Navahrudak
 Novolukoml
 Orsha
 Pastavy
 Pinsk
 Polotsk
 Sapotskin
 Salihorsk
 Slonim
 Smalyavichy
 Smarhon'
 Syanno
 Talachyn
 Vasilievichy
 Verkhnyadzvinsk
 Vitebsk
 Zhlobin
 Zhabinka

Bulgaria
Shumen
Novgrad
Banya
Pet Mogili
 Sofia – in Lenin Square (now St Nedelya Square), installed in 1966 and pulled down in January 1991; the site is now occupied by the Statue of Sveta Sofia

Czech Republic
 Vítězné náměstí (formerly náměstí Říjnové Revoluce) – in the Dejvice quarter of Prague, pulled down in 1990; a war memorial now stands on the site
 Karlovy Vary – Theatre Square (formerly Lenin Square), pulled down in 1990.
 Cheb - Built in 1979, it was located in front of Cheb railway station until 1990, it is now located at the garden of the Franciscan Monastery

Denmark
Worker's Museum, Copenhagen – relocated from Hørsholm where it stood from 1986 until 1996

Estonia
Jõhvi – 1953–1991, sculptors Enn Roos, Arseni Mölder, Signe Mölder
Kohtla-Järve – 1950–1992, copy of statue in Jõhvi
Kallaste – 1988–19??
Narva – 1957–1993, sculptor Olav Männi (21/12/1993-21/12/2022 statue present inside Narva Castle)
Pärnu
1950s–1981
1981–1990, sculptor Matti Varik created a replica of a monument built in Kotka in 1979
Tallinn – 1950–1991, sculptor Nikolai Tomsky
Tartu
1949–1952 sitting Lenin (ferroconcrete), sculptor Sergey Merkurov
1952–1990 standing Lenin bronze, height 3.5 m, weight 3.5 tons; sculptors August Vomm, Garibald Pommer, Ferdi Sannamaes

Finland
Kotka – at Lenin park, removed on 14 June 2022
Turku – near the art museum, removed in 2022
Tampere – inside Lenin museum

France
Montpellier
Paris

Georgia
 Tbilisi – monument stood until 1991 in Freedom Square (Tavisuplebis Moedani)

Germany

 Berlin – Lenin Monument, created in 1970 by Nikolai Tomsky in granite, 19 m, at Leninplatz, removed in 1992 and buried outside Berlin. The statue's head was found  in 2015 and restored and put on display as part of an exhibition on Berlin’s monuments in  Spandau Citadel, Berlin.
One statue of Lenin (approximately 2:1) stood in Kreuzberg (West Berlin) in the yard of a removal company, before being moved to the front of the company's new main building in the district of Neukölln (also West Berlin) in September 2016.
 Gelsenkirchen – A 3-metre statue revealed in 2020, The 1st to ever be erected in West Germany.
 Nohra – restored stone statue at the site of the former Soviet airbase.
 Potsdam – Bust of Lenin, originally at a Soviet Army base, it was placed in the Volkspark for an exhibition in 1994 and was subsequently moved to one of the main entrances where it is used as a children's climbing feature.
 Schwerin – Statue of Lenin, made by the Estonian sculptor Jaak Soans and inaugurated on 22 June 1985. Even nowadays this monument is still causing heated debates among politicians, citizen and historians, who, divided in supporters and detractors, continue arguing about its future.
 Wittstock – a neglected statue outside the derelict cultural centre at the abandoned Soviet military base.
 Wünsdorf (Zossen) – two large statues and a bronze head of Lenin survive at the former Soviet army complex.
 Zeithain – a 2-metre statue at the former Soviet Army training ground.

Greece
 Athens – front of the Headquarters building of the Communist Party of Greece

Hungary
 Budapest – created in 1965 by Patzáy Pál, in City Park. In 1989, the huge statue was lifted off its red granite pedestal (later demolished), and carried away “for restoration”; in 1991, it was moved to Memento Park. Timewheel now stands on the former site.
 Before 1990, every county seat and industrial town had their Lenin statues. Many smaller settlements had their own, too. In 1990 or shortly afterwards, all Lenins were quickly removed.

Italy

Cavriago – at Piazza Lenin (Italian for Lenin Square), near Reggio Emilia
Capri – in the Gardens of Augustus

Latvia
 Cēsis – statue unveiled on November 7, 1959, sculptor Karlis Jansons; removed on October 17, 1990
 Riga – removed on August 25, 1991.

Lithuania
All statues were taken down in 1991 or soon after, most eventually winding up in Grutas Park. They were erected during the Soviet period and stood, among other places, in Vilnius (at least two statues, one of them together with Lithuanian communist leader Kapsukas), Kaunas, Klaipėda, Šiauliai, Jonava, Druskininkai, and Jurbarkas (the Jurbarkas Lenin is now part of an installation in Europos Parkas park in Vilnius).
 Druskininkai – 1981–1991, sculptor N. Petrulis
 Jonava – 1984–1991, sculptor K. Bogdanas
 Kaunas – 1970–1991, sculptor N. Petrulis
 Klaipėda – 1976–1991, sculptor G. Jokubonis
 Palanga – 1977–1991, sculptor Yevgeny Vuchetich
 Panevėžys – 1983–1991, sculptor G. Jokubonis
 Šiauliai – 1970–1991, sculptors A. Toleikis and D. Lukosevicius
 Vilnius
 1952–1991, sculptor Nikolai Tomsky
 1979–1991, "Lenin and Kapsukas in Poronino", sculptor K. Bogdanas

Moldova

 Chișinău – at the Moldexpo site
Edineț – Inside the city park
In the centre (statue) and on the outskirts (bust, near Rompetrol gas station) of Comrat, in the autonomous region of Gagauzia
unrecognised state of Transnistria
Tiraspol – outside the Parliament, the City Soviet building and the Historical Museum
Rîbnița – main square
Bender – opposite the Gorky Cinema & on Moskovskaya Street
Parcani – on Gogol Street
Dnestrovsc – Two busts
 Various other towns and villages in Transnistria have Lenin busts and statues in their centres

Netherlands
 Enschede – in front of the TwentseWelle Museum. It was placed in the context of an exhibition about the GDR.

 Zuidbroek - in front of a burnt down warehouse in the middle of nowhere.

Norway
 Svalbard – two Russian settlements in Svalbard have Lenin statues, Barentsburg and Pyramiden

Poland

 Warsaw – at the Party's House, used in the Palace of Culture and Science during the Congress of the Polish United Workers Party; in 2014 moved to the museum in Kozłówka
 Kraków – in Nowa Huta district, the biggest in Poland, pulled down in December 1989,<ref> UPHEAVAL IN THE EAST; Lenin Statue in Mothballs, The New York Times, December 11, 1989</ref> in 1992 moved to High Chaparral Theme Park in Sweden
 Kraków – in Nowa Huta district, in the area Vladimir Lenin Steelwork (currently Tadeusz Sendzimir Steelworks), removed in 1990
 Kraków – with Joseph Stalin, in Strzelecki Park, removed in 1957
 Gdańsk – in Gdańsk Shipyard (ex Lenin Shipyard), hid in 1990, destroyed in 1991, in 1999 made a copy in the museum of "Solidarity" in Gdańsk Shipyard
 Poronin – pulled down in 1990, since 1999 in the museum in Kozłówka
 Poronin – set up in 2014 on private area, damaged in 2015
 Słubice – removed in 1990
 Mysłowice – in Wesoła district, in the area Coal Mine "Lenin" (currently Coal Mine "Wesoła"), pulled down in 1990
 Legnica – ex-headquarters of the Northern Group of Forces of the Soviet Army, moved to Ulyanovsk in 1993 
 Legnica – at Legnica Airport, ex military unit of the Soviet Army, removed in 1992
 Legnica – in Zosinek district, ex military unit of the Soviet Army, damaged in 1992
 Legnica – in Legnicki Dwór district, ex military unit of the Soviet Army, removed in 1992
 Borne Sulinowo – ex military unit of the Soviet Army, removed in 1992
 Borne Sulinowo – ex military unit of the Soviet Army, removed in 1992
 Brzeg – ex military unit of the Soviet Army, removed in 1992
 Brzeg – ex school in military unit of the Soviet Army, removed in 1991
 Stargard – in Kluczewo district, ex military unit of the Soviet Army, removed ca. 1992
 Kołobrzeg – in Podczele district, leisure centre "Bukowina", head separately, damaged after 1992, before in military unit of the Soviet Army
 Oława – ex military unit of the Soviet Army, removed in 1992
 Swoboda – set up in 1954 in front of the school, moved after 1990 to building ex school
 Poznań – in club and café Proletaryat, set up in 2004
 Maczków – on the balcony of a private building

In 1939–1941, after the attack of the Red Army, statues of Lenin were in: Sokółka, Augustów, Kolno, Suwałki, Białystok (pulled down in June 1941), Łomża, Choroszcz (3x), Brańsk, Bielsk Podlaski, Jedwabne, Siemiatycze, Śniadowo, Czyżewo (pulled down 5 July 1941), Zaręby Kościelne, Zambrów, Przemyśl, Lubaczów, Łapy, Zabłudów etc.

Romania
 Bucharest – designed by sculptor  and built in front of the House of the Free Press in April 1960, it was pulled down in March 1990

Russia

Out of 7,000 Lenin statues as of 1991, Russia retained the vast majority. As of 2022, there are approximately 6,000 monuments to Lenin in Russia.

 Akhtubinsk – a monument installed in the town center, VI Lenin
 Almetyevsk – a monument installed in the center of the city on Lenin Square
 Arzamas – two monuments in the city, in the Cathedral Square and Peace Square
 Arkhangelsk – Only a few remain of the city's many monuments. The monument in the square is the last major Lenin monument to be established in the Soviet Union, in 1988. Others stand in Solombala on the Square, Terekhina on the street, and Gagarin in the yard.
 Astrakhan – monument installed in the square, VI Lenin
 Bakhchysarai (disputed Crimea)
 Balakovo – Saratov region, two monuments
 Barnaul – three on the main avenue, and one in Upland Park. Because of the drapery which is present in the composition of the monument near the street Anatolia, a Lonely Planet guide to Russia has called the monument "Lenin Toreador".
 Belgorod – at Cathedral Square (the former Revolution Square), in Lenin Park, near the now-current cinema "Falcon", and a bust in the Belgorod Dairy Plant (BMP)
 Berezniki – Lenin Square (about Palace of Culture, Lenin)
 Bogoroditsk – town center
 Boksitogorsk – central square (Lenin Square)
 Dubna – 25 m, the second tallest; 15 m statue on a 10 m pedestal
 Dedovsk – a small monument is located opposite the branch of RSCU in the street of Gagarin
 Dimitrovgrad – the town square – the square of the Soviets. A bust is located within the NCC, Slavsky.
 Dmitry – installed in the central square of the historic district
 Dubna – the world's second largest statue of Lenin lies in the vicinity of the "Big Volga". Sculptor SD Merkurov, height 25 m (with pedestal 37 m), weight 540 tons. The monument was erected in 1937 on the banks of the Volga near the beginning of the Moscow Canal. On the other bank was a monument to Stalin. After Stalin's death the monument was blown up, but the pedestal remained.
 Dudinka – monument in front of the House of Culture
 Dyatkovo – on Lenin Square in the town center, next to buildings authorities
 Dzerzhinsk – in Lenin Square. The authors of the improvement and development area are the architects Androsova GD and Sinyavsky EA. Sculptor Nelyubin BS; opened for the 100th anniversary of Vladimir Lenin in 1970.
 Ekaterinburg – main monument in front of City Hall in Lenin Square since 1905; secondary monuments placed at the entrance of the Sverdlovsk Tools Factory Street
 Gelendzhik – monument near the boarding house "Caucasus", st. Mayachnaya
 The working village Settlement on Lenin Street has a monument, built in contemporary Russia (established November 7, 2006). Sculptor V. Fetisov
 Irkutsk
 monument at the crossing of streets Karl Marx and Lenin
 bust on Karl Marx street, in front of a shopping center
 Izhevsk – monument established in 1958 at the National Library of the Udmurt Republic, sculptor PP Yatsynova and architect LN Kulaga, in bronze and granite
 Ishimbay – 1966, the square on the street gutter
 Kazan
 monument standing 1930–1951, in the square and then park in the former Theatre (now Liberty) Square
 the new statue with bleachers installed in 1954 at what was then the main Freedom Square
 monument to young Vladimir Ulyanov (like Moscow) set in 1954 at University Park on the street Kremlin
 a statue of Lenin stands in front of the Lenin House of Culture in Sotsgorod
 Kaliningrad – major monument to Lenin by the sculptor VB Topuridze installed at Victory Square in 1958. In 2005, during the reconstruction of the area, the monument was removed allegedly temporarily, for the restoration, but after the reconstruction the monument was not returned. Mayor of Kaliningrad Yury Savenko put forward the idea of creating the city's Lenin Square, where he could transfer the monument.
 Kaluga – statue in front of the regional administration in the area of old trades that previously had the name Lenin
 Kamensk Shakhtinsky – a monument to Lenin in Kamensk Shakhtinsky square, at the intersection of the Avenue of Karl Marx and Pushkin Street, next to the district council Kamensky district, Rostov region
 Kemerovo – Lenin monument in the Square of the Soviets. One night in 1993 local businessmen made an unsuccessful attempt to demolish the monument.
 Prokopyevsk – statue was destroyed by a drunk man attempting to take a selfie
 Kimry – a monument placed in the town center
 Kirov – Theatre Square, XX Party Congress
 Kolomna – monument installed in the center of the square of the two revolutions
 Krasnodar

 The main urban monument to Lenin, sculptor P. Sabsay, architect A Giants, opened in 1956 on the square in front of the Communist Party Regional Committee (now the Legislative Assembly of Krasnodar Region – KYC), according to government decree of the RSFSR.
 The oldest statue of Lenin in Krasnodar (sculptor K. Dietrich) is in the park to VI Lenin, on the street Vishnyakova. The monument was built in 1925, a year after the death of the Soviet dictator.
 Krasnoturinsk – monument installed in front of the city administration in the city centre
 Krasnoyarsk – statue on Revolution Square in the city centre
 Krasnoznamensk (Moscow region) – set before the House of Culture (house of the garrison officers)
 Kursk – monument installed in front of the city administration in the city centre
 Lodeynoye Pole – Statue in front of train station
 Moscow – There are over 82 Lenin monuments in Moscow, including:
 large monument in downtown Kaluzhskaya Square, opposite the Ministry of Internal Affairs and the Ministry of Justice
 statue at the All-Russian Exhibition Center, Ostankinsky District
 sitting Lenin in Tverskaya Square, opposite the Residence of the Mayor of Moscow
 sitting Lenin at the Park of the December Uprising
 Lenin is depicted in full in a coat and cap at Pavlovskaya Street
 Noginsk - the oldest statue erected in 1924
 Murom
 Omsk - statue on Lenin Street and bust on Bohdan Khmelnytsky Street
 Pokhvistnevo – statue is standing near the Culture Palace
 Pospelikha, Altai Krai - statue is standing near Pospelikhinskaya Makaronnaya Fabrika on Sovetskaya Street. It is notably similar to the statue of Lenin on Burakova Street in Moscow.
 Pskov – statue is standing near the House of Soviets 
 Saint-Petersburg – Statue of Lenin at Finland Station: Lenin giving a speech from an armored car monument is present in the city on Ploshchad Lenina (Lenin Square) next to Finland Railway Station
Samara – Statue of Lenin on Ploshchad Revolyutsii (Revolution Square) in the old part of the city. 
 Sevastopol (disputed Crimea)
 Simferopol (capital of disputed Crimea)
 Tambov – Lenin statue in Lenin Square, in the centre of the city.
 Tyumen - statue in Central Square
 Ulan Ude – biggest head of Lenin in the world, in front of Buryatia government building
 Veliky Novgorod – two monuments: in the Sofia area (established in April 1928, lost by war, restored in 1958) and in Street Trading Ivanskoy side
 Vladikavkaz (sculptor ZI Azgur, architect G. Zakharov) is open on Lenin Square in front of the Russian Drama Theatre. Vakhtangov in 1957. In 1993, twice blown up and subsequently restored.
Volgograd (27 m, the tallest).now in five sites:
 "Great Lenin" – Liberty Square (the intersection of Victory Avenue and the streets of the World)
 "Little Lenin" – the Children's park named after Alexander Pushkin.
 A monument in the main building of the Volgograd State Technical University.
 2 monuments in car-repair factory.
 Lenin monument at the entrance of the Volga-Don channel – set in the Krasnoarmeysk area (height pedestal) – 30 meters, the sculpture – 27 meters. Sculptor – EV Vucetich. Earlier, on the same pedestal, there was a monument to Stalin.
 In the central region on Lenin Square on the 90th anniversary of the monument to Lenin. Sculptor – EV Vucetich.
 In the central region, in the park opposite the building of regional administration.
 The Post Office building is a statue of Lenin.
 Volga:
 Monument to Lenin Square.
 Vyborg:
 A monument in the town square – Red (set in 1957)
 The bust in the house-museum of Lenin
 Yakutsk – Lenin statue in Lenin Square, in the centre of the city.
 Yalta (disputed Crimea)
 Yefremov – a park near the city administration. Also in the park near the police building.
 Zheleznogorsk (Krasnoyarsk region) – Lenin Square opposite the Palace of Culture. There was also the now dismantled joint statue of Lenin and Stalin.

Slovakia

 Bratislava – Built in 1970, after Velvet Revolution it was taken to Nové Mesto nad Váhom. The statue is now privately owned and it is located in the village Drietoma.
 Poprad – Built in 1981 (see Statue of Lenin, Seattle)
 Košice – Built in 1987, the statue stood in front of former Building of Communist Party of Czechoslovakia, in 1989 after Velvet Revolution it was taken to the warehouse of the East Slovak Museum.

Spain
 Bust at Otxarkoaga district of Bilbao, erected without approval from the authorities.

Sweden
 Vittsjö, a small town in southern Sweden.  The statue is privately owned by Calevi Hämäläinen.

United Kingdom

London, Islington Museum – 245 St John Street, Islington. Bust by Berthold Lubetkin commissioned by the UK Government during the war in tribute to the efforts of the Soviet Union. It was placed in Holford Square (briefly Lenin's home when he lived in London) and unveiled in 1942. It was a supposed focal point of a new housing development to be named 'Lenin Court' although the choice of Lenin proved unpopular with the local community and the bust was frequently daubed with anti-communist slogans. Lubetkin had the bust removed and when the housing development was completed in the late 1940s, it was renamed 'Bevin Court'. The bust was displayed in Islington Town Hall for many years and is now on permanent display in the museum.
RAF Museum Cosford - In the national cold War exhibition. A Statue of Lenin holding a gift bag is used as a focal point for the museum's gift shop.
Belfast – The Kremlin Bar, a gay bar, has a statue of Lenin welcoming partygoers over the main entrance.

Ukraine

In 1991 Ukraine had 5,500 Lenin monuments.

Before Ukraine's Euromaidan, Lenin monuments and other Soviet-era monuments were already being removed.Ukraine to remove 10 Soviet-era monuments, UNIAN (28-11-2008) However, in 2008, the 139th anniversary of Lenin, two new Lenin monuments were erected in Luhansk Oblast.

In Ukraine more than 500 statues of Lenin were dismantled between February 2014 and April 2015, after which nearly 1,700 remained standing. On 15 May 2015 President of Ukraine Petro Poroshenko signed a bill into law that set a six-month deadline for the removal of the country's communist monuments. By December 2015 Lenin monuments 1,300 were still standing (in Ukraine).

In April 2015, a formal decommunization process started in Ukraine after laws were approved which, among other acts, outlawed communist symbols.

During the 2022 Russian invasion of Ukraine, many of these statues of Lenin, which had been taken down by Ukrainian activists, were re-erected by Russian occupiers and collaborationists in Russian-controlled areas.

 
 Almazna (occupied by pro-Russian separatists)
 Alupka (disputed Crimea)
 Andriyevo-Ivanove – broken in half on January 4, 2014
 Amvrosiivka (occupied by pro-Russian separatists)
 Antratsyt (occupied by pro-Russian separatists)
 Armiansk (disputed Crimea)
 Bakhchysarai (disputed Crimea)
 Baranivka
 Barvinkove
 Berdychiv
 Bila Tserkva
 Bilopillia
 Bilohirsk (disputed Crimea)
 Bilokurakyne – fell on 10 October 2014
 Bilozerka – removed on 8 July 2014
 Bilytske
 Bohodukhiv – toppled on 10 October 2014
 Boryslav – removed in 1990 
 Brianka (occupied by pro-Russian separatists)
 Brovary
 Chasiv Yar
 Cherkasy – mounted from 1969 to 2008, designed by K.O. Kuznetsov, architect — V.G. Gniezdilo
 Chernobyl main street
 Chernihiv – toppled by protesters on February 21, 2014.
 Chernivtsi – mounted from 1951 to 1992, designed by М.K. Vronsky, O.P. Oliynyk, architect — М. Ashkinazi
 Chervona Svoboda – removed on 8 July 2014
 Chervonopartyzansk (occupied by pro-Russian separatists)
 Chuhuiv
 Derazhnia
 Derhachi – toppled on 29 September 2014
 Dnipropetrovsk – toppled by protesters on February 21, 2014.
Dnipropetrovsk, 2 Lenin monuments were removed by the city in 2014; in March 2014 the city's Lenin Square was renamed "Heroes of Independence Square" in honor of the people killed during Euromaidan. The statue of Lenin on the square was removed. In June 2014 another Lenin monument was removed (parts of the monument were moved to a local history museum) and replaced by a monument for the Ukrainian military fighting against armed insurgents in the Donbas (region of Ukraine)
In May 2016 Dnipropetrovsk was itself officially renamed to Dnipro to comply with decommunization laws.
 Dokuchaievsk (occupied by pro-Russian separatists)
 Donetsk (occupied by pro Russian separatists) – in the Lenin Square
 Dunaivtsi
 Dzhankoy (disputed Crimea)
 Enerhodar
 Fastiv
 Feodosiya (disputed Crimea)
 Hirnyk
 Hirske
 Inkerman (disputed Crimea)
 Ivano-Frankivsk – mounted from 1975 to 1990, designed by H.N. Kalchenko, А.Е. Belostotsky, О.A. Suprun.
 Izmail
 Kamianka-Dniprovska – destroyed on 16 April 2014 
 Kyiv, located in front of Besarabsky Market, erected in the 1950s. (Toppled and dismantled by Ukrainian protesters on December 8, 2013) 
 Kharkiv: At the Freedom Square, erected in 1964. Toppled by protesters on September 28, 2014. Another statue destroyed on 6 October 2014
 Kharkiv:  three monuments to Lenin dismantled by unknown late August 2014. On 19 November 2014, the Kharkiv Administrative Court of appeal upheld the decision of the Kharkiv district administrative court that had dismissed an appeal by the City Council to suspend Baluta's order to dismantle the statue.
 Kherson – toppled on February 22, 2014; restored April 2022
 Khmelnytskyi
 Komsomolsk
 Kostychany – bust of Lenin decapitated on 21 February 2014
 Kotovsk – toppled on December 8, 2013
 Kramatorsk – 3 statues, two of them toppled on 17 April 2015 and 22 April 2015
 Krasnohorivka
 Krasnohrad
 Krasnoperekopsk  (disputed Crimea)
 Krasnyi Luch (occupied by pro-Russian separatists)
 Kremenchuk – broken on November 25, 2008
 Kreminna
 Kryvyi Rih – toppled between 1 and 2 September 2014
 Kurakhove
 Laha – mounted from 1967 to 1991, designed by O.P. Oliynyk, architect — O. Lanko
 Lion-Gri – mounted from 1967 to 1991, designed by М.K. Vronsky, architect — I. Meknychuk
 Lozova
 Luhansk (occupied by pro-Russian separatists)
 Lviv – mounted from 1952 to 1990, designed by Sergey Merkurov, architect — I.O. Frantsuz
 Mariupol: A statue of Lenin was located at the Lenin Avenue (toppled by unknown August 15, 2014). – painted with Ukrainian national colours
 Marinka
 Miusynsk (occupied by pro-Russian separatists)
 Molochansk
 Molodohvardiysk (occupied by pro-Russian separatists)
 Mospyne (occupied by pro-Russian separatists)
 Nikopol – toppled on 25 October 2014
 Nova Kakhovka – Reinstalled in April 2022 by Russian occupiers
 Novomoskovsk September 2015, toppled by protestors.
 Novovoskresenske – toppled on 10 September 2014
 Novosvetlovka – erected in 2008 on the occasion of the 139th anniversary of Lenin's birthday
 Obukhiv – removed in 2009
 Odessa – mounted in 1967 to 2006, designed by Matvey Manizer, О.М. Manizer, architects: I.Ye. Rozin, Yu.S. Lapin, М.М. Volkov, relocated to the park of Lenin's Komsomol
 Oleksandrivsk (occupied by pro-Russian separatists)
 Orikhiv
 Panchenkove – erected in 2008 on the occasion of the 139th anniversary of Lenin's birthday
 Pavlohrad – toppled on 17 November 2014
 Petrovske (occupied by pro-Russian separatists)
 Poltava – toppled by protesters on February 21, 2014.
 Polohy
 Popasna
 Prymorsk
 Pryvillia
 Rodynske
 Rovenky (occupied by pro-Russian separatists)
 Saky (disputed Crimea)
 Selydove
 Sevastopol (disputed Crimea)
 Shcholkine (disputed Crimea)
 Simferopol (capital of disputed Crimea)
 Siversk
 Sloviansk – removed on 3 June 2015
 Snizhne (occupied by pro-Russian separatists)
 Soledar
 Starobilsk
 Staryi Krym (disputed Crimea)
 Sudak (disputed Crimea)
 Sukhodilsk (occupied by pro-Russian separatists)
 Sumy – mounted from 1982 to the early 2000s, designed by E. Kuntsevych, architects O. Zavarov and I. Lanko, relocated to the park at the city limits, the Lenin statue outside the House of Culture was removed by the city in 2014 and a statue to Cossack leader Herasym Kondratiev will replace it
 Svatove – toppled on 30 September 2014
 Sverdlovsk  (occupied by pro-Russian separatists)
 Svitlodarsk (occupied by pro-Russian separatists)
 Teplohirsk (occupied by pro-Russian separatists)
 Ternopil – mounted from 1967 to 1990. It was designed by М.Ye. Roberman, architect — G. Karasiev
 Tokmak
 Ukrainsk
 Uzhgorod – mounted from 1974 to 1991, designed by М.K. Vronsky and O.P. Oliynyk, architects Yu.O. Maksymov and V.O.Sikorsky
 Valky
 Varva
 Vilniansk (occupied by the pro Russian separatists)
 Vinnytsia – mounted from 1972 to 1991, designed by А. Kovalev, V.I. Agibalov, Ya.I. Ryk
 Vovchansk
 Vuhlehirsk (occupied by pro-Russian separatists)
 Yalta (disputed Crimea)
 Yunokomunarivsk (occupied by pro-Russian separatists)
 Zaporizhia – disguised in Vyshyvanka on 4 October 2014, was removed by the city on 17 March 2016.
 Zmiiv
 Zolote (partially occupied by pro-Russian separatists)
 Zorynsk (occupied by pro-Russian separatists)
 Zuhres (occupied by pro-Russian separatists)

See also
List of statues of Joseph Stalin
List of monuments of Pope John Paul II
List of places named after Vladimir Lenin
Chiang Kai-shek statues
Fallen Monument Park

References

Further reading
 Tumarkin, Nina. Lenin Lives!: The Lenin Cult in Soviet Russia (Harvard University Press, 1983).
 Joffre-Eichhorn, Hjalmar Jorge; Anderson, Patrick and Johann Salazar (eds.). Lenin150 (Samizdat)'' (KickAss Books, 2020; 2nd, expanded edition: Daraja Press, 2021).

External links 
 
 Monuments of Lenin
 List of Lenin monuments in the former GDR on "Kunst am Wege" (German)
 Lenin lives on in bronze and on screens around the world
 "Lenin is still around" Complete and actualized list of Lenin monuments still standing in Germany (German/English)

Lenin
Cultural depictions of Vladimir Lenin
Monuments and memorials to Vladimir Lenin

Statues of heads of government